is a Japanese mixed martial artist currently competing in the Featherweight division of the Rizin Fighting Federation. A professional competitor since 2005, he appeared in the Japanese MMA event Dynamite!! 2009 event and has also competed for Ultimate Fighting Championship, Shooto, and Strikeforce.

Background
Born and raised in Japan, Hirota experienced success as an amateur boxer and sumo, winning All-Japan titles in both disciplines.

Mixed martial arts career

Early career
Hirota made his professional debut for Shooto, winning his first two fights by TKO and then won his next four fights all by unanimous decision to reach an undefeated professional record of 6–0. Hirota then faced Takashi Nakakura for the newly vacated Shooto Pacific Rim Welterweight Championship. Hirota was handed his first professional loss via unanimous decision and then lost his next fight, also by unanimous decision.

Hirota then signed with Cage Force, and in his debut, knocked out his opponent 16 seconds into the fight before getting another win via TKO.

In his next fight in April 2008, at Cage Force 6, Hirota defeated Tomonari Kanomata to win the Cage Force Lightweight Championship.

Sengoku
Hirota then entered the Sengoku 2008 Lightweight Grand Prix where he won his first-round fight by knocking out the last IFL Lightweight Champion, Ryan Schultz, at Sengoku 4 in August 2008. He was then eliminated from the tournament in the semi-finals after losing by unanimous decision against Kazunori Yokota at World Victory Road Presents: Sengoku 6 in November the same year.

In February 2009 he defended his Cage Force title when he fought to a draw with multiple-time King of Pancrase, Katsuya Inoue, and in May 2009 he defeated PRIDE veteran Mitsuhiro Ishida by knockout at Shooto Tradition Final.

On August 2, 2009, at Sengoku 9, Hirota was matched up with the eventual Sengoku Lightweight Grand Prix Champion and the inaugural Sengoku Lightweight Champion, Satoru Kitaoka. Hirota, who was an underdog going in to the fight, had to defend multiple submission-attempts by Kitaoka during the first round, but came back in the second landing strikes on the feet while stopping Kitaoka's takedown-attempts. In the third, Kitaoka was able to take Hirota down and control him on the ground eventually resulting in a yellow-card inactivity-warning for Hirota as he did not improve his position. The fourth round saw Hirota damage Kitaoka with knee-strikes while on the feet, prompting Kitaoka to shoot in for a takedown. Hirota defended it and continued to land knees to the head of the grounded Kitaoka which forced the referee to step in at 2:50, giving Hirota the TKO victory to become the new Sengoku Lightweight Champion.

Dynamite!! 2009
On December 31, 2009, Hirota faced DREAM and WAMMA Lightweight Champion Shinya Aoki. In the first round Aoki caught Hirota in a hammerlock. When Hirota refused to submit, Aoki broke Hirota's arm and won the fight.

On March 7, 2010, Hirota announced during Sengoku 12 that he would be vacating his belt due to his injuries sustained at Dynamite!! 2009.

DEEP
A year after he officially vacated his Sengoku Lightweight Championship belt, Hirota began fighting for DEEP. Hirota's debut for the organization was against Katsunori Kikuno for the DEEP Lightweight Championship and Hirota won via unanimous decision, and then defended his belt against Seichi Ikemoto, winning again via unanimous decision. Hirota then vacated his title in April 2012.

Strikeforce
On May 29, 2012, it was announced that Hirota would make his United States debut for Strikeforce in July 2012 against Pat Healy. In a back and forth bout, Hirota showcased technical boxing and some take down defense, but Healy was able to land more during the clinch. Hirota lost the close battle by unanimous decision (30-27, 29–28, 29–28). Strikeforce commentator and former UFC Middleweight Champion Pat Miletich stated the decision was affected by the home town favoring their own fighter.

Hirota was next scheduled to face Jorge Gurgel on September 29, 2012, but the event was cancelled before the company ceased operations. Hirota was signed along with many other Strikeforce competitors to compete in the UFC.

Ultimate Fighting Championship
Hirota faced Rani Yahya on March 3, 2013, at UFC on Fuel TV 8. The fight was Hirota's first fight as a Featherweight. After losing the first two rounds, Hiroto was able to keep the fight standing in the third, but it was not enough under the scorecard and he lost his debut via unanimous decision.

In his second UFC fight, Hirota faced Rodrigo Damm at UFC on Fuel TV: Nogueira vs. Werdum on June 8, 2013. He lost the back-and-forth fight via split decision and was subsequently released from the promotion following the loss.

Road to UFC: Japan
In June 2015, Hirota was announced as one of the eight featherweights competing on Road to UFC: Japan, a show in the style of The Ultimate Fighter.  On the show he faced Nobumitsu Osawa in the quarter finals and won by decision.  He then faced Daiki Hata in the semifinals and again won by decision.  Hirota ultimately faced Teruto Ishihara in the finals at UFC Fight Night 75.  Post-fight the UFC announced that Hirota and Ishihara would both be awarded contracts.

Hirota was expected to face Cole Miller on October 15, 2016, at UFC Fight Night 97. However, the promotion announced on October 6 that they had cancelled the event entirely. In turn, the fight was rescheduled and eventually took place on December 17, 2016, at UFC on Fox 22 Hirota won the bout by unanimous decision.

Mizuto Hirota faced Alexander Volkanovski on June 10, 2017, at UFC Fight Night 110. He lost the fight by unanimous decision.

Hirota was expected to face Charles Rosa on September 23, 2017, at UFC Fight Night 117. After struggling with the weigh-in, Hirota was forced to pull from the event due to health concerns.  He was deemed unfit to compete by the UFC medical team.

Hirota faced Ross Pearson in a lightweight bout on February 11, 2018, at UFC 221. He lost the fight via unanimous decision.

Hirota faced Christos Giagos on December 2, 2018, at UFC Fight Night 142. He lost the fight via unanimous decision.

Rizin
After being released from the UFC after three straight losses, Hirota signed with Rizin Fighting Federation and is expected to face Roberto de Souza at Rizin 17 on July 28, 2019. He lost the bout in the first round via knockout.

Championships and accomplishments
Cage Force
Cage Force Lightweight Championship (One time)
DEEP
DEEP Lightweight Championship (One time)
One Successful Defense
Sengoku
Sengoku Lightweight Championship (One time, final)
Ultimate Fighting Championship
Road to UFC: Japan Featherweight Tournament Co-Winner (Drew with Teruto Ishihara)

Mixed martial arts record

|-
|Loss
|align=center|18–11–2
|Roberto de Souza
|KO (punches)
|Rizin 17
|
|align=center|1
|align=center|3:05
|Saitama, Japan
|
|-
|Loss
|align=center|18–10–2
|Christos Giagos
|Decision (unanimous)
|UFC Fight Night: dos Santos vs. Tuivasa 
|
|align=center|3
|align=center|5:00
|Adelaide, Australia
|  
|-
|Loss
|align=center|18–9–2
|Ross Pearson
|Decision (unanimous)
|UFC 221 
|
|align=center|3
|align=center|5:00
|Perth, Australia
|
|-
|Loss
|align=center|18–8–2
|Alexander Volkanovski
|Decision (unanimous)
|UFC Fight Night: Lewis vs. Hunt
|
|align=center|3
|align=center|5:00
|Auckland, New Zealand
|
|-
|Win
| align=center| 18–7–2
| Cole Miller
| Decision (unanimous)
| UFC on Fox: VanZant vs. Waterson
| 
| align=center|3
| align=center|5:00
| Sacramento, California, United States
| 
|-
|Draw 
| align=center|  17–7–2
| Teruto Ishihara
| Draw (split)
| UFC Fight Night: Barnett vs. Nelson
| 
| align=center|3
| align=center|5:00
| Saitama, Japan
|  
|-
|  Win
| align=center| 17–7–1
| Kyu Hwa Kim
| TKO (soccer kick and punches)
| DEEP: Dream Impact 2014: Omisoka Special
| 
| align=center| 2
| align=center| 0:33
| Saitama, Japan
|
|-
|  Win
| align=center| 16–7–1
| Masakazu Imanari
| TKO (punches)
| DEEP: 69 Impact
| 
| align=center| 2
| align=center| 1:38
| Tokyo, Japan
| 
|-
|  Win
| align=center| 15–7–1
| Daisuke Nakamura
| Decision (unanimous)
| DEEP: 66 Impact
| 
| align=center| 3
| align=center| 5:00
| Tokyo, Japan
| 
|-
|  Loss
| align=center| 14–7–1
| Rodrigo Damm
| Decision (split)
| UFC on Fuel TV: Nogueira vs. Werdum
| 
| align=center| 3
| align=center| 5:00
| Fortaleza, Brazil
| 
|-
|  Loss
| align=center| 14–6–1
| Rani Yahya
| Decision (unanimous)
| UFC on Fuel TV: Silva vs. Stann 
| 
| align=center| 3
| align=center| 5:00
| Saitama, Japan
| 
|-
|  Loss
| align=center| 14–5–1
| Pat Healy
| Decision (unanimous)
| Strikeforce: Rockhold vs. Kennedy 
| 
| align=center| 3
| align=center| 5:00
| Portland, Oregon, United States
| 
|-
|  Win
| align=center| 14–4–1
| Seichi Ikemoto
| Decision (unanimous)
| DEEP: 57 Impact
| 
| align=center| 3
| align=center| 5:00
| Tokyo, Japan
| 
|-
|  Win
| align=center| 13–4–1
| Katsunori Kikuno
| Decision (unanimous)
| DEEP: 55 Impact
| 
| align=center| 3
| align=center| 5:00
| Tokyo, Japan
| 
|-
|  Loss
| align=center| 12–4–1
| Shinya Aoki
| Technical Submission (hammerlock)
| Dynamite!! The Power of Courage 2009
| 
| align=center| 1
| align=center| 2:17
| Saitama, Japan
|
|-
|  Win
| align=center| 12–3–1
| Satoru Kitaoka
| TKO (knees)
| World Victory Road Presents: Sengoku 9
| 
| align=center| 4
| align=center| 2:50
| Saitama, Japan
| 
|-
|  Win
| align=center| 11–3–1
| Mitsuhiro Ishida
| TKO (punches)
| Shooto: Shooto Tradition Final
| 
| align=center| 1
| align=center| 1:33
| Tokyo, Japan
| 
|-
| Draw
| align=center| 10–3–1
| Katsuya Inoue
| Draw
| GCM: Cage Force EX
| 
| align=center| 3
| align=center| 5:00
| Saitama, Japan
| 
|-
|  Loss
| align=center| 10–3
| Kazunori Yokota
| Decision (unanimous)
| World Victory Road Presents: Sengoku 6
| 
| align=center| 3
| align=center| 5:00
| Saitama, Japan
| 
|-
|  Win
| align=center| 10–2
| Ryan Schultz
| KO (superman punch)
| World Victory Road Presents: Sengoku 4
| 
| align=center| 2
| align=center| 4:25
| Saitama, Japan
| 
|-
|  Win
| align=center| 9–2
| Tomonari Kanomata
| TKO (punches)
| GCM: Cage Force 6
| 
| align=center| 1
| align=center| 1:00
| Tokyo, Japan
| 
|-
|  Win
| align=center| 8–2
| Johnny Frachey
| TKO (punches)
| Cage Force EX Eastern Bound
| 
| align=center| 2
| align=center| 0:08
| Tokyo, Japan
| 
|-
|  Win
| align=center| 7–2
| Do Gi Sin
| KO (punches)
| Cage Force 5
| 
| align=center| 1
| align=center| 0:16
| Tokyo, Japan
| 
|-
|  Loss
| align=center| 6–2
| Ganjo Tentsuku
| Decision (unanimous)
| Shooto: Shooting Disco 2: The Heat Rises Tonight
| 
| align=center| 3
| align=center| 5:00
| Tokyo, Japan
| 
|-
|  Loss
| align=center| 6–1
| Takashi Nakakura
| Decision (unanimous)
| Shooto: Back To Our Roots 1
| 
| align=center| 3
| align=center| 5:00
| Yokohama, Japan
| 
|-
|  Win
| align=center| 6–0
| Jin Kazeta
| Decision (unanimous)
| Shooto: The Devilock
| 
| align=center| 3
| align=center| 5:00
| Tokyo, Japan
| 
|-
|  Win
| align=center| 5–0
| Danilo Cherman
| Decision (unanimous)
| Shooto: The Victory of the Truth
| 
| align=center| 3
| align=center| 5:00
| Tokyo, Japan
| 
|-
|  Win
| align=center| 4–0
| Kabuto Kokage
| Decision (unanimous)
| Shooto: 12/17 in Shinjuku Face
| 
| align=center| 2
| align=center| 5:00
| Tokyo, Japan
| 
|-
|  Win
| align=center| 3–0
| Yoshihiro Koyama
| Decision (unanimous)
| Shooto: 9/23 in Korakuen Hall
| 
| align=center| 2
| align=center| 5:00
| Tokyo, Japan
| 
|-
|  Win
| align=center| 2–0
| Komei Okada
| TKO (punches)
| Shooto: 6/3 in Kitazawa Town Hall
| 
| align=center| 1
| align=center| 4:56
| Tokyo, Japan
| 
|-
|  Win
| align=center| 1–0
| Masaaki Yamamori
| TKO (punches)
| Shooto: 2/6 in Kitazawa Town Hall
| 
| align=center| 2
| align=center| 1:27
| Tokyo, Japan
|

References

External links
 
 

Living people
1981 births
Japanese male mixed martial artists
Japanese male boxers
Japanese male judoka
Japanese sumo wrestlers
Lightweight mixed martial artists
Featherweight mixed martial artists
Mixed martial artists utilizing boxing
Mixed martial artists utilizing judo
Mixed martial artists utilizing Sumo
World Victory Road champions
Deep (mixed martial arts) champions
Ultimate Fighting Championship male fighters